Araz Mahammad oglu Budagov (December 7, 1938 – May 27, 2021) was an Azerbaijani physician, teacher, and deputy.

Early years and education 
Araz Budagov was born on December 7, 1938, in Umudlu village of Agdam region to Mahammad Ismayil oglu Budagov and his mother was Jeyran Aga gizi Huseynova. He was the eldest of 10 children—7 boys and 3 girls. His family was part of a farming collective.

In 1956, Budagov graduated from Gulluja village secondary school in the Agdam district. He entered the Azerbaijan State Medical Institute the same year and graduated with honors in 1962.

Career 

After graduating, he moved to Sabirabad, where he worked as a chief physician in rural hospitals in Yolchubeyli, Garatepe and Ulacali. He also worked as a doctor at an ambulance station. In 1963, he joined a field hospital in the village of Akhiskha, where he remained until his retirement in 2011. Throughout his career, he taught students in a number of medical schools and health centres in Sabirabad, Shirvan, and surrounding villages. In 1969, he was elected to the Surra Village Council of Workers' Deputies from the 14th Akhishka constituency. He joined the District Committee of the Medical Workers' Union in 1977 as chairman and remained for 11 years. He also served as a Azerbaijan SSR deputy for Sabirabad's district council. In 2005, he was invited by President Ilham Aliyev to the opening of the Mugan clinicin the Mughan plain. Doctor Araz was also invited to the opening ceremony as a guest.

Personal life and death 
Budagov married nurse Aliyeva Shalala Arastun in 1978 and they have five children: daughters Günay, Güney, Günəş, and Günel, and son Məhəmməd. At the time of his death, Budagov had 11 grandchildren, the last of whom is his namesake.

Budagov died on May 27, 2021 in Surra from heart failure and medical errors. The following day, he was buried in the Akhiskha village cemetery. A petition to rename the Akhishka rural field hospital where Budagov worked for nearly 50 years after him was spread among locals following his death.

Awards and honors 

 Jubilee Medal "In Commemoration of the 100th Anniversary of the Birth of Vladimir Ilyich Lenin" – (April 7, 1970)
 Honorary degree of the USSR Red Cross and Red Crescent Society – (December 29, 1971)
 Order dedicated to the 50th anniversary of the USSR Red Cross and Red Crescent Movement (1923-1973) - (May 23, 1973)
 Honorary degree dedicated to the 50th anniversary of the Red Cross and Red Crescent Movement Society of the Azerbaijan SSR - (June 29, 1973)
 Medal "Winner of the Socialist Race" (1973) - (February 27, 1974)
 Honorary degree of the Republican Committee of the Trade Union of Health Workers of the Azerbaijan SSR - (December 3, 1975)
 Honorary degree of the Presidium of the Supreme Soviet of the Azerbaijan SSR - (September 21, 1976)
 Medal "Winner of the Socialist Race" (1976) - (August 2, 1977)
 Medal "Winner of the Socialist Race" (1978) - (May 23, 1979)
 Certificate of "Knowledge" Society - (February 3, 1982)
 Certificate of "Knowledge" Society - (August 28, 1983)
 "The USSR Health Excellence" badge - (June 13, 1983)
 Honorary degree of the Sabirabad District Committee of the Communist Party of Azerbaijan - (1987)
 Certificate of "Knowledge" Society - (February 8, 1988)
 Honorary Decree of the Executive Power of Sabirabad District of the Republic of Azerbaijan - (June 17, 2001)
 Award of the "Azerbaijan and Europe" Editorial Office - (November 4, 2008)
 Honorary diploma of Sabirabad Central District Hospital - (December 31, 2008)
 Honorary diploma of Sabirabad Central District Hospital - (June 17)

Documentation

Public materials

Awards

References

External links 
 An article about Budagov on the website of the online political and public newspaper Muğanın səsi
 Article about Budagov on the website of "Muğan Şirvan" newspaper
 Letter from Budagov to President of the Republic of Azerbaijan Ilham Aliyev (April 16, 2016)
 Letter from Budagov to President of the Republic of Azerbaijan Ilham Aliyev (October, 2020)
 Letter from Budagov to President of the Republic of Azerbaijan Ilham Aliyev (December 6, 2020)

1938 births
2021 deaths
Azerbaijani educators
People from Agdam District
Azerbaijan Medical University alumni
20th-century Azerbaijani physicians
People from Sabirabad District
Soviet physicians